The 2010 Masters of Formula 3 was the twentieth Masters of Formula 3 race, and was held at Circuit Park Zandvoort in the Netherlands on 6 June 2010.

The race was won by Valtteri Bottas, for ART Grand Prix, becoming the first person to win the event twice, having won the race the year before. The podium was completed by other Formula 3 Euro Series drivers, with Bottas' team-mate Alexander Sims finishing second having started from pole position, while Signature's Marco Wittmann was third.

Drivers and teams

Notes

Classification

Qualifying

Race

References

Masters of Formula Three
Masters
Masters
Masters of Formula Three